Porania is a genus of starfish in the family Poraniidae in the order Valvatida.

Species
The following species are recognised:- 

Porania antarctica E. A. Smith, 1876
Porania hermanni Madsen, 1959
Porania pulvillus (O.F. Müller, 1776)
Porania stormi Dons, 1936

References

Poraniidae
Taxa named by John Edward Gray